The 2010–11 Algerian Cup was the 47th edition of the Algerian Cup. JS Kabylie won the Cup by defeating USM El Harrach 1–0 in the final with a goal from Farès Hamiti in the 13th minute. It was the fifth time in the club's history that JS Kabylie won the Algerian Cup.

On 7 December 2010, the draw for the Round of 64 was held.

Schedule

Round of 64

Round of 32

Round of 16
On 8 March 2011, the draw for the third and fourth round of the Algerian Cup were held at a ceremony at the Sheraton in Algiers. The matches of the Round of 16 are scheduled to be played on 15 March 2011.

Matches

Quarter-finals
The quarter-finals are scheduled to be played on 8 and 9 April.

Matches

Semi-finals
The draw for the semi-finals was held on 12 April, with the two semi-finals scheduled for 18 April.

Matches

Final

Details

Top scorers

References

External links
 Coupe d'Algérie 2011

Algerian Cup
Algerian Cup
Algerian Cup